Vasilakakis is a Greek surname. Notable people with the surname include:

Kostas Vasilakakis (born 1957), Greek footballer and manager
Theodoros Vasilakakis (born 1988), Greek footballer

Greek-language surnames
Surnames